= Shehu Haruna Lambu =

Nigerian politician

Member of the House of Representatives
- In office 1990 to 2003 – 2003 to 2007
- Constituency: Kano state

Personal details
- Born: Kano State
- Occupation: Politician

Shehu Haruna Lambu is a Nigerian politician from Kano State who served as the representative for Dawakin-Tofa/Tofa/Rimin Gado in the House of Representatives at the National Assembly. He was elected for two consecutive terms: from 1990 to 2003, and 2003 to 2007, as a member of the People's Democratic Party (PDP).

== Early life and education ==
Shehu Haruna Lambu was born in April 1964 in Kano State, Nigeria. He holds a Bachelor of Science in education (Integrated Science) from A.B.U. Zaria.

== Political career ==
Lambu served as the representative for the Dawakin-Tofa/Tofa/Rimin Gado constituency in the National Assembly's House of Representatives for three consecutive terms, from 1990 to 2003, and then again from 2003 to 2007. He was succeeded by Tijjani Abdulkadir Jobe in 2007 after the completion of his tenure.
